Unexpected Riches is a 1942 Our Gang short comedy film directed by Herbert Glazer. It was the 211th Our Gang short (211th episode, 122nd talking short, 123rd talking episode, and 42nd MGM produced episode).

Plot
Weighing themselves on a penny machine, the gang receives a fortune card predicting that they will receive "unexpected riches." Acting upon this, the kids decide to dig for buried treasure, using a fraudulent map provided by one of their wise-guy acquaintances. Though the treasure hunt comes a-cropper, the fortune card's prediction comes true in an unexpected fashion.

Cast

The Gang
 Bobby Blake as Mickey
 Billy Laughlin as Froggy
 George McFarland as Spanky
 Billie Thomas as Buckwheat

Additional cast
 Barry Downing as Ken Reed
 Emmet Vogan as Mr. Reed
 Ernie Alexander as Mickey's father
 Margaret Bert as Mickey's mother
 Willa Pearl Curtis as Big Shot's mother
 Symona Boniface as Person in Froggy's dream
 Stanley Logan as Person in Froggy's dream
 Ernestine Wade as Person in Buckwheat's dream

Notes
Unexpected Riches is the last appearance of George McFarland as Spanky, ending his eleven-year tenure with the series. Billie "Buckwheat" Thomas would remain the only holdover from the Hal Roach Our Gang era to stay with the series until its end in 1944.

See also
 Our Gang filmography

References

External links

1942 films
1942 comedy films
American black-and-white films
Films directed by Herbert Glazer
Metro-Goldwyn-Mayer short films
Our Gang films
1942 short films
1940s American films
1940s English-language films